The Church of St. Blaise is a Baroque church in Dubrovnik and one of the city's major sights. Saint Blaise (St. Vlaho), identified by medieval Slavs with the pagan god Veles, is the patron saint of the city of Dubrovnik and formerly the protector of the independent Republic of Ragusa.

The church was built in 1715 by the Venetian architect and sculptor Marino Gropelli (1662-1728) on the foundations of the badly damaged Romanesque medieval church. He modeled the church on  Sansovino's Venetian church of San Maurizio.

The church consists of a single square nave with a ground plan in the form of an inscribed Greek cross, an apse flanked by two sacristies and an oblong cupola in the center. A flight of stairs leads to the portal, decorated with statues of angels. The facade is divided by four Corinthian columns. On top of the facade is a semicircular gable and a balustrade with three statues by Marino Gropelli: a free standing Saint Blaise (in the middle) and personifications of Faith and Hope.

The barrel-vaulted interior is richly decorated in Baroque style. The Corinthian columns in the center bear the tambour of the cupola and lantern. The corners of the nave show blind cupolas. The main altar, in a combination of white and polychrome marble, shows in a high niche a precious, gilt silver Gothic statue of Saint Blaise, crafted in the 15th century by an unknown local master. The saint shows in his left hand a scale model of the Romanesque church which was destroyed by the earthquake in 1667. He is flanked by two kneeling angels. This statue was the only one to survive the fire of 1706. The domed antependium is decorated with two angels who unveil a curtain in front of a medallion.

References

 Katarina Horvat-Levaj "Church of St. Blaise, Dubrovnik" in Discover Baroque Art
 Dubrovnik, history, culture, art heritage by Antun Travirka; Forum, Zadar, 2014; 

Buildings and structures in Dubrovnik
Roman Catholic churches completed in 1715
18th-century Roman Catholic church buildings in Croatia
Baroque church buildings in Croatia
Tourist attractions in Dubrovnik